The Highwealth - City of Leadership is a complex of twin residential skyscrapers located in Gushan District, Kaohsiung, Taiwan. The buildings were completed in 2016. As of January 2021, the buildings are the 10th tallest in Kaohsiung. Designed by T. D. LEE Architects, the buildings were constructed under strict requirements of preventing damage caused by earthquakes and typhoons common in Taiwan.

See also 
 List of tallest buildings in Taiwan
 List of tallest buildings in Kaohsiung
 Kingtown King Park

References

2016 establishments in Taiwan
Residential skyscrapers in Taiwan
Skyscrapers in Kaohsiung
Apartment buildings in Taiwan
Residential buildings completed in 2016
Twin towers